R-15 was a concert by Filipina recording artist Regine Velasquez held on April 21, 2001, at the Grand Ballroom of the Manila Hotel in Ermita. The show's concept and name is a reference to the fifteenth anniversary of Velasquez's professional debut in 1986. It was produced by EE Concerts Production, with Freddie Santos as the stage director. Gerard Salonga served as the music director and conductor, backed by the Manila Philharmonic Orchestra. The set list featured songs taken from Velasquez's discography, which incorporated tracks she released from her cover albums.

Background and development
Filipina singer Regine Velasquez's career began with a record deal with OctoArts International and the release of her single "Love Me Again" in 1986. After an appearance in the variety show The Penthouse Live!, she caught the attention of Ronnie Henares, a producer and talent manager who signed her to a management deal. The following year, she released her debut album Regine (1987) through Viva Records. In 1993, she signed an international record deal with PolyGram Records, and achieved commercial success in some Asian territories with her albums Listen Without Prejudice (1994), My Love Emotion (1995) and Retro (1996). In April 1996, Velasquez staged a show, titled Isang Pasasalamat, at the University of the Philippines's Sunken Garden to celebrate her ten-year career milestone.

In April 2001, the Philippine Daily Inquirer published that Velasquez would headline a concert on the eve of her birthday on April 21, at the Manila Hotel's Fiesta Pavilion Grand Ballroom in Ermita. The show, called R-15, was described as a "double celebration" which also marked the fifteenth anniversary of Velasquez's professional debut. Discussing her milestone, Velasquez stated: "This career made it possible for me to give my family a comfortable life. It taught me courage, self-confidence, and perseverance. I matured a lot because of this business." R-15 was produced by EE Concerts Production, with Freddie Santos tapped as the stage director. She re-teamed with Gerard Salonga, who served as the music director and conductor, after their first collaboration in her concert Songbird Sings the Classics in 2000. Velasquez and Salonga were accompanied by the Manila Philharmonic Orchestra.

Synopsis

The concert opened with Velasquez's performance of her first single "Love Me Again" accompanied by the Manila Philharmonic Orchestra. She continued with two songs from her 1987 debut studio album Regine: "Urong Sulong" and "Kung Maibabalik Ko Lang". Shortly after, she sang "Narito Ako", before performing her cover of ABBA's "Dancing Queen", which was mashed with Orleans's "Dance With Me". During "Follow The Sun", Velasquez went down to the audience section and interacted with the crowd. Next, she began with "You've Made Stronger" and then performed a medley of her duets joined by her background vocalists.

The setlist continued with an acoustic performance of "Sana Maulit Muli", which was followed by renditions of Velasquez's soundtrack themes, "Kailangan Ko'y Ikaw", "Pangako", and "You Are My Song". She followed this with her cover of Jeffrey Osborne's "On the Wings of Love". The next number saw her perform a Spanish version of her single "Ikaw", which was entitled "Tu". At this point, Southern Sons's "You Were There" was performed, before closing the show with "You'll Never Walk Alone". After the song ended, she bowed and thanked the audience before exiting the stage. For the encore, Velasquez returned onstage for a performance of "Tuwing Umuulan" and "Never Ever Say Goodbye".

Set list
This set list is adapted from the television special R-15.

 "Love Me Again"
 "Urong-Sulong"
 "Kung Maibabalik Ko Lang"
 "Narito Ako"
 "Dancing Queen" / "Dance With Me" 
 "Follow The Sun"
 "You've Made Me Stronger"
 "Please Be Careful with My Heart" / "In Love with You" / "Forever" / "Muli" / "Magkasuyo Buong Gabi"
 "Sana Maulit Muli"
 "Kailangan Ko'y Ikaw"
 "Pangako"
 "You Are My Song"
 "On the Wings of Love"
 "Tu"
 "You Were There"
 "You'll Never Walk Alone"
 "Tuwing Umuulan"
Encore
 "Never Ever Say Goodbye"

See also
 List of Regine Velasquez live performances

Notes

References

Citations

Book sources

External links
 Tours of Regine Velasquez at Live Nation

Regine Velasquez concert tours
2001 concerts